The 1916 New York Giants season was the franchise's 34th season. The team finished in fourth place in the National League with an 86–66 record, 7 games behind the Brooklyn Robins.  This season introduced a new uniform design.

Opening day games
The first game of the home season was on April 20, 1916, at the Polo Grounds. John Purroy Mitchel threw the ceremonial first pitch.

Regular season 
The 1916 Giants set a still-standing Major League record for the longest winning streak at 26 games between September 7 to 30. Earlier in the season, the Giants had won 17 consecutive games. Despite the winning streaks, no Giants pitcher won 20 games.

For the only time in franchise history, the Giants failed to score a run in a three-game series; they were shut out in all three games against St. Louis, August 20–22.

Former Federal League star Benny Kauff led the team in runs batted in and stolen bases.

Season standings

Record vs. opponents

Notable transactions 
 August 28, 1916: Larry Doyle, Merwin Jacobson, and Herb Hunter were traded by the Giants to the Chicago Cubs for Heinie Zimmerman and Mickey Doolan.

Roster

Player stats

Batting

Starters by position 
Note: Pos = Position; G = Games played; AB = At bats; H = Hits; Avg. = Batting average; HR = Home runs; RBI = Runs batted in

Other batters 
Note: G = Games played; AB = At bats; H = Hits; Avg. = Batting average; HR = Home runs; RBI = Runs batted in

Pitching

Starting pitchers 
Note: G = Games pitched; IP = Innings pitched; W = Wins; L = Losses; ERA = Earned run average; SO = Strikeouts

Other pitchers 
Note: G = Games pitched; IP = Innings pitched; W = Wins; L = Losses; ERA = Earned run average; SO = Strikeouts

Relief pitchers 
Note: G = Games pitched; W = Wins; L = Losses; SV = Saves; ERA = Earned run average; SO = Strikeouts

Awards and honors

League top five finishers 
George Burns
 NL leader in runs scored (105)
 4th in NL in stolen bases (37)

Benny Kauff
 2nd in NL in stolen bases (40)
 4th in NL in RBI (74)

Dave Robertson
 MLB leader in home runs (12)
 3rd in NL in runs scored (88)

References

External links
1916 New York Giants season at Baseball Reference

New York Giants (NL)
San Francisco Giants seasons
New York Giants season
New York G
1910s in Manhattan
Washington Heights, Manhattan